Mount Sheer is a mountain summit located in British Columbia, Canada.

Description 
Mount Sheer is a 1,752-meter-elevation (5,748-foot) peak situated nine kilometers (5.6 miles) east of Britannia Beach and 2.15 kilometers (1.3 mile) south of line parent Sky Pilot Mountain. It is part of the North Shore Mountains which are a subrange of the Coast Mountains. Precipitation runoff from the peak drains east into tributaries of the Stawamus River, and west to Howe Sound via Britannia Creek. Topographic relief is significant as the summit rises over 750 meters (2,460 feet) above the river in two kilometers (1.2 mile). The mountain's toponym was officially adopted June 4, 1953, by the Geographical Names Board of Canada.

Climate 

Based on the Köppen climate classification, Mount Sheer is located in the marine west coast climate zone of western North America. Most weather fronts originate in the Pacific Ocean, and travel east toward the Coast Mountains where they are forced upward by the range (Orographic lift), causing them to drop their moisture in the form of rain or snowfall. As a result, the Coast Mountains experience high precipitation, especially during the winter months in the form of snowfall. Temperatures in winter can drop below −20 °C with wind chill factors below −30 °C.

See also 
 Geography of British Columbia

References

External links
 Mount Sheer: weather forecast

One-thousanders of British Columbia
North Shore Mountains
Squamish-Lillooet Regional District
Sea-to-Sky Corridor